The Pischahorn is a mountain of the Silvretta Alps, located east of Davos, in the Swiss canton of Graubünden. Several trails lead to its summit.

References

External links
 Pischahorn on Hikr

Mountains of the Alps
Mountains of Switzerland
Mountains of Graubünden
Davos